Sir Hildebrand Aubrey Harmsworth, 1st Baronet (15 March 1872 – 18 April 1929) was a British newspaper proprietor, twice unsuccessful parliamentary candidate, and member of the Harmsworth publishing family.

Early life and family
Hildebrand Harmsworth was born on 15 March 1872, the fifth son of Alfred Harmsworth, a barrister, and Geraldine Mary, daughter of William Maffett. He was the brother of Alfred Harmsworth, 1st Viscount Northcliffe, Harold Harmsworth, 1st Viscount Rothermere, Cecil Harmsworth, 1st Baron Harmsworth and Leicester Harmsworth, 1st Baronet. He was educated privately and in 1892 went up to Merton College, Oxford, but did not stay to complete a degree.

Marriage
Harmsworth married Kathleen Mary Berton on 4 July 1900, daughter of E. Denny Berton, MB, CM. By the time of the 1911 census they were living at First Avenue, Hove, East Sussex. They had four sons, Hildebrand Alfred Beresford Harmsworth, 2nd Baronet (1901–1977) Ronald Aubrey Leicester Harmsworth (1902 – 26 January 1946), Chamberlain Michael Hildebrand Harmsworth (b. 1903), and Perceval Anthony Thomas Harmsworth (b. 1907). His grandson was Hildebrand Harold Harmsworth, 3rd Baronet.

Politics
Harmsworth stood for the Parliamentary seat of Gravesend, Kent, in the British 1900 general election as a Liberal Imperialist but was not elected. He stood for the Wellington, Shropshire, seat as a tariff reformer and Liberal Unionist in the 1906 general election but was again unsuccessful, achieving 39% of the vote.

In 1905, a boy was killed in a motor accident at Markyate, Hertfordshire, leading to demands in the Daily Mail that driving tests and certificates of competence be introduced, and the offer of a £100 reward to catch the "motor criminals". It soon transpired that the car involved in the accident, which did not stop, was owned by Hildebrand Harmsworth, brother of Sir Alfred Harmsworth, owner of the Daily Mail, and driven by Hildebrand's  chauffeur. The passengers were Hildebrand Harmsworth's political supporters. The chauffeur was eventually sentenced to a jail term of six months hard labour and his passengers censured for failing to insist that the car stop after the accident. Hildebrand Harmsworth gave £300 to a charity fund to help the boy's mother.

Career
Harmsworth was the publisher of The Globe from 1908 to 1911 which he bought from the Armstrong family who had been represented by Sir George Armstrong as editor-in-chief. Waldon Peacock became the new editor under Harmsworth who proceeded to try to modernise the paper, aspects of which had not changed for 50 years.

He was the joint editor of a short-lived monthly periodical, New Liberal Review with his brother Cecil Harmsworth, from its foundation in 1901 to its closure in 1904.

Described by David McKie as "famously useless", Harmsworth became a baronet in the 1922 Birthday Honours, one of a long and controversial list of honours proposed  by David Lloyd George which eventually led to the Honours (Prevention of Abuses) Act 1925. On hearing the news, his family sent him a telegram with the sarcastic message "At last, a grateful nation has given you your due reward."

Death and legacy
Harmsworth died on 18 April 1929, of cirrhosis of the liver. He is buried in St Helen's churchyard, Hove, with his second son Ronald. He left a legacy to Merton College to be used to fund scholarships for postgraduate study.

See also
 Baron Harmsworth

References

External links

1872 births
1929 deaths
Baronets in the Baronetage of the United Kingdom
Hildebrand
British publishers (people)
Liberal Unionist Party parliamentary candidates
Deaths from cirrhosis